This article presents the discography of American country-pop musician Lee Hazlewood as a recording artist. His songwriting credits on recordings by other musicians are not included here.

Albums

Main albums

Collaborations

Production and songwriting

References 

Discographies of American artists